Three Forks is a city in Gallatin County, Montana, United States and is located within the watershed valley system of both the Missouri and Mississippi rivers drainage basins — and is historically considered the birthplace or start of the Missouri River. The population was 1,989 at the 2020 census. The city of Three Forks is named so because it lies geographically near the point, in nearby Missouri Headwaters State Park, where the Jefferson, Madison, and Gallatin Rivers converge to form the Missouri River — the longest single river in North America, as well as the major portion of the Missouri-Mississippi River System from the headwaters near Three Forks to its discharge into the Gulf of Mexico. Three Forks is part of the Bozeman, MT Micropolitan Statistical Area of approximately 100,000 people and located thirty miles west of Bozeman.

History

The three rivers, west to east, were named by Meriwether Lewis in late July 1805 for President Thomas Jefferson, Secretary of State James Madison, and Treasury Secretary Albert Gallatin which was in the times the genesis of a mild controversy and eventually spawned a modern-day geographical controversyin both cases regarding length comparisons between the Missouri and Mississippi rivers. Today the two confluences are incorporated inside Missouri Headwaters State Park, which is also a U.S. National Historic Landmark.

The Lewis and Clark expedition visited the site on July 28, 1805.  Meriwether Lewis in his journal entry wrote:

One consequence of their decision to designate, map and name the Jeffersonthe largest as a separate tributary river, is that today the Mississippi river can arguably be called longer than the Missouri river because extensive re-channelization of the streambed for hydroelectric power projects has shortened the river while the Mississippi Delta has grown, lengthening the rival river.

Honored in Three Forks, the Indian woman Sacagawea is best known as the interpreter and guide for the Lewis and Clark Expedition. In 1800, she was captured by the Mennetaree tribe near the present site of Three Forks. She later returned to this area with Lewis and Clark and the Corps of Discovery. A statue of Sacagawea now sits in a park off Main Street.

The present-day city of Three Forks was founded September 17, 1908 by John Q. Adams, a Milwaukee Road land agent. The Milwaukee (Railroad) Land Co., platted the town and held a lot sale that day. Some buildings were moved to the present city from "Old Town Three Forks", a mile to the northeast. The city became a division point on the Milwaukee Road's Rocky Mountain Division and was an important hub for the railroad during the existence of the Milwaukee in Montana (1908-1980).

Two banks for the town were chartered in 1909 and 1910;  John Q. Adams financed construction of the latter one, the Three Valleys State Bank, whose building survives, is listed on the National Register of Historic Places, and serves as a local history museum.  The town's early growth prospects foundered from the effects of economic depression, crop failures, and an earthquake that hit the town on June 27, 1925, damaging all of its brick buildings.  The town's population never reached the 10,000 level that some once hoped for, and dropped to about 1,000.  Some prosperity returned during and after World War II, and population has grown modestly since.

Geography
Three Forks is located at  (45.891334, -111.551532).

Climate

Photo Gallery

Demographics

2010 census
As of the census of 2010, there were 1,869 people, 785 households, and 524 families residing in the city. The racial makeup of the city was 98.1% White, 0.2% African American, 0.4% Native American, 0.5% Asian, and 0.9% from two or more races. Hispanic or Latino of any race were 2.1% of the population.

There were 785 households, of which 31.1% had children under the age of 18 living with them, 51.2% were married couples living together, 9.0% had a female householder with no husband present, 6.5% had a male householder with no wife present, and 33.2% were non-families. 28.4% of all households were made up of individuals, and 11.3% had someone living alone who was 65 years of age or older. The average household size was 2.37 and the average family size was 2.90.

The median age in the city was 40.8 years. 24.8% of residents were under the age of 18; 6.4% were between the ages of 18 and 24; 24.5% were from 25 to 44; 28.4% were from 45 to 64; and 15.8% were 65 years of age or older. The gender makeup of the city was 49.9% male and 50.1% female.

2000 census
As of the census of 2000, there were 1,728 people, 686 households, and 469 families residing in the city. The population density was 1,360.7 people per square mile (525.3/km). There were 726 housing units at an average density of 571.7 per square mile (220.7/km). The racial makeup of the city was 97.57% White, 1.10% Native American, 0.17% Asian, 0.23% Pacific Islander, 0.35% from other races, and 0.58% from two or more races. Hispanic or Latino of any race were 1.33% of the population.

There were 686 households, out of which 35.4% had children under the age of 18 living with them, 59.3% were married couples living together, 5.8% had a female householder with no husband present, and 31.5% were non-families. 26.7% of all households were made up of individuals, and 12.1% had someone living alone who was 65 years of age or older. The average household size was 2.51 and the average family size was 3.08.

In the city, the population was spread out, with 28.4% under the age of 18, 6.0% from 18 to 24, 28.9% from 25 to 44, 21.8% from 45 to 64, and 15.0% who were 65 years of age or older. The median age was 38 years. For every 100 females there were 102.8 males. For every 100 females age 18 and over, there were 102.6 males.

The median income for a household in the city was $34,212, and the median income for a family was $39,938. Males had a median income of $30,086 versus $19,196 for females. The per capita income for the city was $15,362. About 5.5% of families and 7.7% of the population were below the poverty line, including 6.6% of those under age 18 and 6.7% of those age 65 or over.

Government
The City of Three Forks is a Mayor–council government form of government in which the City Council is chaired by an elected Mayor.  These two entities form the legislative and executive branches of the government.  There are six elected City Council members.

Infrastructure
Three Forks Airport is a public use airport located 1 mile southeast of town.

Education
Three Forks Schools educates students from kindergarten through 12th grade. Three Forks High School's team name is the Wolves.

The Three Forks Community Library is a public library.

Community

Area attractions such as Lewis and Clark Caverns State Park have made Three Forks and the surrounding area a hub for tourism.  Three Forks is at the cross-roads of Interstate 90 and U.S. Route 287.

References

External links

 City website
 Chamber of Commerce website
 Three Forks High School
 Three Forks Herald - local newspaper
 Gallatin County Emergency Management

Cities in Gallatin County, Montana
Cities in Montana